Gloria Nardi (born 14 July 2000) is an Italian professional racing cyclist, who last rode for the UCI Women's Team  during the 2019 women's road cycling season.

References

External links

2000 births
Living people
Italian female cyclists
Place of birth missing (living people)